Passport is a German jazz ensemble led by saxophonist Klaus Doldinger. Passport was formed in 1971 as a jazz fusion group, similar to Weather Report. The ensemble's first recording was issued in 1971. The band's membership has had numerous changes over the years. The lineup that brought them to European and international prominence in the mid 1970s consisted of Doldinger, drummer Curt Cress, guitarist/bassist Wolfgang Schmid and keyboardist Kristian Schultze. The group has recorded for Atlantic and Warner Bros.

Members

 Brian Auger – keyboards
 Frank Roberts - keyboards
 Philip Catherine – guitar
 Curt Cress – drums
 Klaus Doldinger – saxophone, flute, keyboards
 Johnny Griffin
 Jim Jackson – drums
 Brian Spring - drums
 Willy Ketzer – drums
 Alexis Korner – guitar, vocals
 Volker Kriegel – guitar
 Olaf Kubler – saxophone, flute
 Udo Lindenberg – drums
 Elmer Louis
 Roy Louis
 Lothar Meid – bass
 Peter O'Mara – guitar
 Alphonse Mouzon – drums
 Kevin Mulligan – guitar
 Dieter Petereit (de) – bass
 Patrick Scales – bass
 Hendrik Schaper
 Wolfgang Schmid – bass, guitar
 John Mealing - keyboards
 Kristian Schultze – keyboards
 Vladislav Sendecki – keyboards
 Hermann Weindorf – keyboards, vocals
 Roykey Whydh – guitar
 Pete York – drums

Discography
 Passport (Atlantic, 1971)
 Second Passport (Atlantic, 1972)
 Looking Thru (Atlantic, 1973)
 Hand Made (Atlantic, 1973)
 Doldinger Jubilee Concert (Atlantic, 1974)
 Doldinger Jubilee '75 (Atlantic, 1975)
 Cross-Collateral (Atlantic, 1975) U.S. No. 137
 Infinity Machine (Atlantic, 1976)
 Iguacu (Atlantic, 1977) U.S. No. 191, U.S. Jazz No. 23
 Ataraxia (titled Sky Blue in the US) (Atlantic, 1978) U.S. No. 140, U.S. Jazz No. 12
 Garden of Eden (Atlantic, 1979) U.S. Jazz No. 17
 Lifelike with Klaus Doldinger (Atlantic, 1980)
 Oceanliner (Atlantic, 1980) U.S. No. 163, U.S. Jazz No. 14
 Blue Tattoo (Atlantic, 1981) U.S. No. 175, U.S. Jazz No. 14
 Earthborn (Atlantic, 1982) U.S. Jazz No. 40
 Man in the Mirror (WEA, 1983)
 Running in Real Time (WEA, 1985)
 Heavy Nights (WEA, 1986)
 Talk Back (WEA, 1988)
 Balance of Happiness (WEA, 1990)
 Blues Roots (WEA, 1991)
 Down to Earth (WEA, 1993)
 Passport to Paradise (WEA, 1996)
 Move (WEA, 1998)
 Live with Klaus Doldinger (WEA, 2000)
 Back to Brazil (Warner, 2003)
 Passport to Morocco (Warner, 2006)
 On Stage (Warner, 2008)
 Inner Blue (Warner, 2011)
 En Route (Warner, 2015)
 Doldinger (Warner, 2016)
 Motherhood (Warner, 2020)

References

External links
 Official site
 

German jazz ensembles
Jazz fusion ensembles
Musical groups established in 1971
Atlantic Records artists